Molien v. Kaiser Foundation Hospitals,  (1980), was a case decided by the Supreme Court of California that first recognized that a "direct victim" of negligence can recover damages for emotional distress without an accompanying physical injury.

Factual background
A doctor employed by the defendant hospital incorrectly diagnosed a patient as having syphilis.  The doctor encouraged the patient to disclose the illness to her husband, and when she communicated the erroneous diagnosis to her husband, their marital relationship was destroyed. When it was determined that the diagnosis was incorrect, the husband brought an action against the hospital for negligent infliction of emotional distress.

Decision
The court ruled that the risk of harm to the husband of the patient from a misdiagnosis was reasonably foreseeable, and that the tortious conduct was directed at the patient and her husband.  As a "direct victim," the strict criteria for negligent infliction of emotional distress need not be fulfilled.

See also
Cahoon v. Cummings (2000), Indiana case law

References

Negligence case law
1980 in United States case law
California state case law
1980 in California
United States tort case law
Kaiser Permanente hospitals